The 1923 Colorado Agricultural Aggies football team represented Colorado Agricultural College (now known as Colorado State University) in the Rocky Mountain Conference (RMC) during the 1923 college football season.  In their 13th season under head coach Harry W. Hughes, the Aggies compiled a 5–2–1 record, tied for second place in the RMC, and outscored all opponents by a total of 121 to 35. The team played its home games at Colorado Field in Fort Collins, Colorado.

On Thanksgiving, November 27, 1923, Colorado Agricultural met Colorado in Fort Collins for their annual rivalry game. Both teams were undefeated against conference opponents, and the winner would be crowned as the conference champion. Colorado won by a 6–3 score as neither team scored a touchdown, and both teams were limited to field goals. Colorado kicked the final, game-winning field goal with only 45 seconds remaining in the game.

On November 30, 1923, the All-Rocky Mountain Conference football team selected by the conference coaches was announced.  Three Colorado Agricultural players were named to the first team: Houser at halfback; Bain at guard; and Weigle at tackle. Between them, Colorado and Colorado Agricultural accounted for seven of the eleven first-team selections.

Schedule

References

Colorado Agricultural
Colorado State Rams football seasons
Colorado Agricultural Aggies football